Hollywood is an unincorporated community in Carver County, in the U.S. state of Minnesota.

History
Hollywood was platted in 1856. A post office was established at Hollywood in 1869, closed in 1870, reopened in 1882, closed permanently in 1898.

References

Unincorporated communities in Carver County, Minnesota
Unincorporated communities in Minnesota